Hemidactylus gramineus is a species of gecko. It is endemic to the Democratic Republic of Congo where it is known from its type locality, Bombo-Lumene Reserve (Kinshasa Province).

References

Hemidactylus
Geckos of Africa
Reptiles of the Democratic Republic of the Congo
Endemic fauna of the Democratic Republic of the Congo
Reptiles described in 2021
Taxa named by Ishan Agarwal
Taxa named by Aaron M. Bauer
Taxa named by Luis M. P. Ceríaco
Taxa named by Eli Greenbaum
Taxa named by Chifundera Kusamba